Robyn Kershaw is an Australian independent film and television producer, best known for her work on feature drama, Looking for Alibrandi (2000), musical-comedy, Bran Nue Dae (2009), the hit TV series Kath & Kim (original run: 2002–2005) and working with the YouTube sensation Mychonny on Sucker (2015), Mychonny Moves In (2015) and The China Boy Show (2017).

Career
Though Kershaw is now known as one of Australia's most well respected film and television producers, her career in the arts began in theatre production.

From 1989 to 1994, Kershaw was general manager of Belvoir St Theatre in Sydney where she produced the projects of some of Australia's most well known film artists, including Geoffrey Rush and Toni Collette. The relationships she made during this time were invaluable to her future in the film and television industries. Four years later, she started her own production companies, Robyn Kershaw Productions and RKPix.

In 2001, Kershaw became the Head of Drama and Narrative Comedy for the Australian Broadcasting Corporation (ABC) during which time she executive produced over 140 hours of TV including the smash comedy hit, Kath & Kim (series 1, 2 and 3), created by and starring Jane Turner, Gina Riley and Magda Szubanski. Kath & Kim, became the highest rated TV comedy in Australia and the highest rated show on ABC from 2002 to 2004. Kershaw also executive produced the award winning drama series, MDA, which received the first nomination for an ABC drama from the International Emmys.

In 2004, Kershaw returned to independent production to focus her efforts on RKP and RKPix.

Robyn Kershaw Productions and RKPix
In 1998, Kershaw founded and continues to act as both company director and producer for both Robyn Kershaw Productions Pty Ltd (RKP) and RKPix Pty Ltd based in Australia.

Robyn Kershaw Productions Pty Ltd is a film and television production company created, according to the company slogan, to produce projects that promise to "enable people to laugh, think and celebrate life". It focuses on the development of a film, seeing it through each stage of production, from conception to production and distribution.

Kershaw’s first feature was the adaptation of the best selling novel Looking for Alibrandi (2000). Written by Melina Marchetta (adapted from her own novel), directed by Kate Woods and starring Anthony LaPaglia, Greta Scacchi and Pia Miranda, Looking for Alibrandi was a box office hit in Australia and won five Australian Film Institute Awards, including Best Film and Best Actress.

Kershaw went on to produce box office hit, Bran Nue Dae (2009), directed by Rachel Perkins and starring Geoffrey Rush, Jessica Mauboy and Magda Szubanski. Bran Nue Dae was screened at over 20 film festivals including Toronto International Film Festival (2009), Dubai International Film Festival, Sundance Film Festival (2010), the 60th Berlin International Film Festival (2010), the Cannes Cinephiles at the Festival de Cannes and Goa's International Film Festival of India. It won the Audience Award at both the Melbourne International and the London Australian Film Festivals.

In February 2013, Kershaw released the Indian Australian cricket comedy, Save Your Legs! in Australia through Madman Entertainment. Save Your Legs! was directed by Boyd Hicklin and stars Stephen Curry, Brendan Cowell and Damon Gameau. The film was shown at the 2012 Melbourne International Film Festival, the BFI London Film Festival and the Mumbai Film Festival.

Kershaw executive produced My Mistress, released through Transmission Films. My Mistress was directed by Stephen Lance and stars Emmanuelle Beart, Harrison Gilbertson, Rachael Blake and Socratis Otto. The film was premiered at the 2014 Melbourne International Film Festival.

In 2015, Kershaw produced the feature comedy Sucker co-written by Ben Chessell and Lawrence Leung, starring Timothy Spall and the YouTube sensation John Luc. The film waspremiered at the 2015 Melbourne International Film Festival.

Organizations
Kershaw has served on the boards of the Australian Film Finance Corporation (now known as Screen Australia) and ScreenWest Australian screen funding and development agencies.

Filmography

References

External links 
 rkershawproductions.com
 rkpix.com

Australian film producers
Living people
Year of birth missing (living people)